In Tibetan cuisine, Zhoima Mogu is wild ginseng, with melted yak butter and sugar.

See also
 List of Tibetan dishes

References

Tibetan cuisine